The Financial Services Regulatory Authority of Ontario (FSRA) is a self-funding Crown agency which acts as the financial regulator for the Canadian province of Ontario. Established in 2016, FSRA officially succeeded its predecessor agencies – the Financial Services Commission of Ontario and the Deposit Insurance Corporation of Ontario – on June 8, 2019. The Financial Services Regulatory Authority of Ontario operates at arms-length from the Government of Ontario, and reports to the Legislative Assembly of Ontario through the Minister of Finance.

Regulated sectors

FSRA regulates the insurance, credit union, caisse populaire, mortgage brokerage, loan, trust, and pension administration sectors in Ontario. Additionally it provides deposit insurance for members of provincially-incorporated credit unions and caisses populaires.

See also
 Ontario Securities Commission
 Pension regulation in Canada

References

External links 

Financial regulatory authorities of Canada
Ontario government departments and agencies
Crown corporations of Ontario
2016 establishments in Ontario
Companies based in Toronto
Insurance regulation
Insurance in Canada
Pension regulation
Deposit insurance